The 1940 Illinois Fighting Illini football team was an American football team that represented the University of Illinois during the 1940 Big Ten Conference football season.  In their 28th season under head coach Robert Zuppke, the Illini compiled a 1–7 record  (0–5 against conference opponents), finished in last place in the Big Ten Conference, and were outscored by a total of 144 to 71. Fullback George Bernhardt was selected as the team's most valuable player. The team played its home games at Memorial Stadium in Champaign, Illinois.

Schedule

References

Illinois
Illinois Fighting Illini football seasons
Illinois Fighting Illini football